Mihirakula (Gupta script: , Mi-hi-ra-ku-la, Chinese: 摩酰逻矩罗 Mo-hi-lo-kiu-lo), sometimes referred to as Mihiragula or Mahiragula, was the second and last Alchon Hun king of northwestern region of the Indian subcontinent between 502 and 530 CE. He was a son of and successor to Toramana of Huna heritage. His father ruled the Indian part of the Hephthalite Empire. Mihirakula ruled from his capital of Sagala (modern-day Sialkot, Pakistan).

In around 520 CE, the Chinese monk Song Yun met with Mihirakula. According to the 7th-century travelogue of the Chinese Buddhist pilgrim and student Xuanzang, Mihirakula ruled several hundreds of years before his visit, was initially interested in Buddhism, and sought a Buddhist teacher from monasteries in his domain. They did not send him a learned Buddhist scholar. Feeling insulted, he converted to Hinduism, became anti-Buddhist and destroyed the monasteries in his kingdom.

Mihirakula patronized the Shaivite sect of Hinduism. However, except for rare texts such as Rajatarangini, he is hardly acknowledged and never praised in Hindu texts. The Rajatarangini calls him cruel, "a man of violent acts and resembling kala (death)", who ruled "the land then overrun by hordes of mlecchas (foreigners)." According to the Chinese Buddhist pilgrim Song Yun, Mihirakula "does not believe in any religion", the Brahmins who live in his kingdom and read their sacred texts do not like him, his people were unhappy.

The Buddhist texts record Mihirakula as extremely cruel and bad mannered, the one who destroyed Buddhist sites, ruined monasteries, killed monks. The Hindu kings Yashodharman and Gupta Empire rulers, between 525 and 532 CE, likely by 530 CE, reversed Mihirakula's campaign and ended the Mihirakula era.

Etymology
The name "Mihirakula" is most likely of Iranian origin and may have the meaning "Mithra's Begotten", as translated by Janos Harmatta. According to Harold Walter Bailey: "A name like Toramana and his son's name Mihirakula interpreted by North Iranian (and not by Western Iranian) are clearly Iranian".

Description
According to Krishna Chandra Sagar, the Huna king Toramana was cruel and barbaric, his son Mihirakula even more so, during their rule. Mihirakula had conquered Sindh by 520 CE, had a large elephant and cavalry-driven army. Mihirakula destroyed Buddhist sites, ruined monasteries, according to Sagar. Yashodharman, sometime between 525 and 532 CE, reversed Mihirakula's campaign and triggered the end of Mihirakula and the Alchon Huns.

Mihirakula issued coins, like the Kushana era kings, showing Oesho or Shiva, as he was a devout patron of Shaivism, or he just replaced his image in the traditional Kushana-style way of making coins at the mints. Other scholars state that there are many legends surrounding this era and historical facts are difficult to ascertain. Except for rare Kashmiri texts such as Rajatarangini, he is hardly acknowledged and never praised in Hindu texts. The 12th-century Rajatarangini includes him as one of the kings in regional history, then calls him cruel, "a man of violent acts and resembling kala (death)", who ruled "the land then overrun by hordes of mlecchas (foreigners)." Contradictory evidence is found in the memoir left by the Chinese Buddhist pilgrim Song Yun, reputed to have met Mihirakula. He states that Mihirakula "does not believe in any religion", that the Brahmins who live in his kingdom and read their sacred texts do not like him, his people were exhausted and unhappy with his wars and destruction.

Xuanzang
The 7th-century Chinese pilgrim Xuanzang (Hsuan Tsang) left a travelogue. This text includes a hearsay story about Mihirakula, who he says ruled several hundred years ago from his capital of Sagala (now Sialkot, Pakistan). This estimate is incorrect, as there is only about 100 year difference between Mihirakula rule and Xuanzang pilgrimage in India. Xuanzang states that after coming to power, Mihirakula asked Buddhist monasteries in his domain to send him a scholar to teach Buddhism. However, based on the reputation of his father and his own, the monks and scholars did not go. They sent a novice. This angered Mihirakula. He then ordered the destruction of the Buddhist religion:

The cruel deeds and the news of destruction by Mihirakula spread to other Indian kingdoms. The king of Magadha announced a war against him. Mihirakula proceeded to invade eastern kingdoms including Magadha. He was defeated and captured by the Gupta king Narasimhagupta Baladitya. The Magadha king tried him and declared the right punishment for Mihirakula to be execution. However, Baladitya's mother intervened and argued against capital punishment.

Mihirakula's life was thus spared. Meanwhile, during Mihirakula stay in prison, his associate had already completed a coup and taken power in Sagala. After his release from Magadha, Mihirahula arrived in the kingdom of Kashmira, where the local king gave him a territory to govern. Mihirakula then usurped power over Kashmira. He assassinated the king of Kashmira, and thereafter annexed Gandhara after a surprise assassination of its king and a slaughter of all its ministers. He looted the country and carried the spoils to his capital. He killed more people and also demolished 1600 stupas and monasteries, states Xuanzang. Mihirakula's campaign of destruction and his attempt to regain his Bactria-encompassing empire came to an end after the central Indian king Yashodharman defeated him. According to Xuanzang, Mihirakula died a sudden death. After his death, the Buddhist scholars in this land declared that "he will fall in the deepest hell of incessant suffering and rotate [in the wheel of rebirth] without end" (Li Rongxi translation).

According to Xuanzang's travelogue, despite Mihirakula destructive campaign during his rule, thousands of monasteries of different Buddhist schools – both Hinayana and Mahayana, as well as monks and scholars were thriving in northwestern regions of the subcontinent when he visited (629–645 CE), including the countries of Udyana, Balura, Taksasila, Gandhara, Kashmira and Rajapura. He studied for months in several of these places, and two years in a Kashmira monastery. Even in the 6th-century capital Sagala of Mihirakula, Xuanzang's 7th-century travelogue states that there is a monastery with more than hundred monks studying Hinayana Buddhism, along with a 200 feet high stupa next to it (compare Guanyin of Mount Xiqiao). Around the capital, to its northwest and northeast, he describes some ruins as well as several other major ancient stupas from Ashoka's era, all over 200 feet.

Cosmas Indicopleustes

The 6th-century Alexandrian traveler Cosmas Indicopleustes states that the Hephthalites in India reached the zenith of its power under "Gollas", which is thought to be the same as Mihirakula from the last part of his name.

Gwalior inscription

The Gwalior inscription issued in the 15th regnal year created by Matricheta in a Surya temple, mentions Mihirakula. It confirms that Mihirakula rule extended to Gwalior.

Mandasor Pillar Inscriptions of Yasodharman

In 528 Mihirakula suffered a defeat in the Battle of Sondani by the Aulikara dynasty Hindu king Yashodharman, an event that is partly the subject of the Mandasor pillar inscription of Yasodharman. The defeat ended the Alchon Hun era in India.

Critical studies

Medieval era Chinese Buddhist pilgrims depict the early 6th-century Mihirakula as a tyrant and persecutor of their religion. However, according to Jason Neelis – a scholar of Buddhist studies and religious history, all evidence including those in their travelogue suggests that, despite his rule in Punjab, Gandhara and Kashmir regions, there was "no negative impact on the growth of Buddhist monasteries" in these regions over previous centuries. Some early Indian studies, such as by D.C. Sircar, have incorrectly used coins or a questionable prashasti inscription of the Aulikaras (unrelated to Mihirakula) to declare him a Shaiva ruler, and declare him as selectively persecuting the Buddhists. The Aulikara inscription is actually referring to Shiva as the family deity of the Aulikaras, states Neelis. This has perpetuated John Marshall's incorrect conjecture that "Mihirakula destroyed Buddhism in Gandhara", wiping out the Buddhist monasteries in the northwest. Later archaeological studies affirm that the major Buddhist monastery at Harwan – near Srinagar, Kashmir – was "built" during this period. According to Shōshin Kuwayama – a Buddhist history scholar, there is no evidence whatsoever that Mihirakula destroyed Buddhism in Gandhara, there is plenty of evidence that he did not and that it continued to grow and thrive in and around northwest Indian subcontinent for many centuries after Mihirakula's death. Mihirakula was cruel, but his cruelty did not discriminate based on religion, nor did it destroy or reverse Buddhism in the northwest.

The travelogue of Xuanzang states that initially Mihirakula was interested in learning about Buddhism, and asked the monks to send him a teacher; the monks sent him a novice servant for the purpose. He felt insulted. This incident is said to have turned Mihirakula virulently anti-Buddhist.

Historian Upinder Singh has raised some questions over the anti-Buddhist reputation of Mihirakula while considering these episodes of violence:-

Singh considers the symbolism on his coinage (some of his copper coins have a bull on the reverse with the inscription "The bull should be victorious"), and some inscriptions, as possible evidence that Mihirakula was inclined toward Shaivism. She adds that this and other material evidence is "confusing" yet significant that "such perceptions of violent royal persecution and oppression on religious lines existed". Even if the accounts of Mihirakula persecution is true or exaggerated, it was against the general trends of royal religious policy of that period.

See also
 Battle of Sondani

Notes

References

Bibliography

External links

 

6th-century Indian monarchs
Year of death missing
Year of birth missing
Place of birth missing
History of Kashmir
Hephthalites
History of India
History of Pakistan